Van de Water is a Dutch toponymic surname meaning "from the water". Variants are Van de Waeter, Van der Water and Van der Wateren. People with this name include:

Charles F. Van de Water (1872–1920), American (California) Republican politician
Frederic Franklyn Van de Water (1890–1968), American journalist and fiction writer
George Roe Van De Water (1854–1925), American Episcopalian priest
Jacobus van de Water (1643–aft.1673), Dutch mayor of New Amsterdam
Marjorie Van de Water (1900–1962), American science writer and journalist
Ruth Van de Water, American theoretical particle physicist
Silvester van der Water (born 1996), Dutch football winger

See also
Van De Water Glacier, part of the near-extinct Carstensz Glacier in New Guinea, named after Abraham van de Water (1879–1938), who in 1913 was the first European to reach this "eternal" snow

References

Dutch-language surnames
Dutch toponymic surnames